Pashons 1 - Coptic calendar - Pashons 3

The second day of the Coptic month of Pashons, the ninth month of the Coptic year. In common years, this day corresponds to April 27, of the Julian Calendar, and May 10, of the Gregorian Calendar. This day falls in the Coptic Season of Shemu, the season of the Harvest.

Commemorations

Martyrs 

 The martyrdom of Saint Philotheos (1096 A.M.), (1380 A.D.)

Saints
The departure of the Righteous Job
The departure of Saint Theodore of Tabennisis, the disciple of Saint Pakhom

References 

Days of the Coptic calendar